Sklodowska may refer to:
The maiden name of Marie Curie, a Polish chemist
Sklodowska (lunar crater), a crater on the Moon
Sklodowska (Martian crater), a crater on Mars